Leamington Spa railway station serves the town of Royal Leamington Spa, in Warwickshire, England.  It is situated on Old Warwick Road towards the southern edge of the town centre. It is a major stop on the Chiltern Main Line between London and Birmingham, and the branch line to Coventry.

History
The first station at the site, under the name Leamington was opened by the Great Western Railway (GWR) on its new main line between Birmingham, Oxford and London in 1852. It was later renamed Leamington Spa in 1913.

This was not the first station in Leamington; the London and North Western Railway (LNWR) had reached the town eight years earlier in 1844, with a branch line from Coventry. The opening of the GWR line compelled the LNWR to extend their Coventry branch into the centre of Leamington, and join it end-on to their new branch to Rugby, and in 1854 they opened a new station directly alongside the GWR station known as Leamington Spa (Avenue). In 1864, a connection was made between the GWR and LNWR lines at Leamington, which was mainly used to exchange goods traffic. 

James G. Batterson, the founder of American insurance giant The Travelers Companies, claimed that he first became aware of accident insurance in 1859 when he bought a railway ticket from this station to London which included accidental death insurance up to the amount of £1,000.

In the 1930s the GWR took advantage of a government loan guarantee scheme to fund improvements to their railway network; one of these improvements was the complete rebuilding between 1937-39 of their station at Leamington in the then popular Art Deco style, to the designs of the GWRs Chief Architect Percy Emerson Culverhouse.

The station came under the control of the Western Region of British Railways in 1948, who renamed the station Leamington Spa (General) in 1950, before reverting to Leamington Spa in 1968. In 1965 British Railways closed down the adjacent Avenue station and the branch to Rugby, and diverted the Coventry branch into the ex-GWR station via a new connection. Prior to this there had only been sidings connecting the Coventry line to the ex-GWR line, used for the exchange of goods wagons. BR also removed passenger services from the Coventry branch at the same time, and closed all of the intermediate stations, leaving it open for freight trains only. This lasted until 1977, when BR resumed passenger trains between Leamington and Coventry.

In 1996, Chiltern Railways took over the running of the station and the London to Birmingham services, upon the privatisation of British Rail.

In 2011 the two waiting rooms were restored and refurbished as part of £395,000 improvements that also include 80 new parking spaces at the front of the station and improved disabled access.

The station building and platform structures became grade II listed buildings in 2003.

The station today

Routes
Three lines radiate from Leamington Spa:
one going north through Kenilworth to Coventry;
one heading south-east towards Banbury, beyond which it splits into routes heading for London (Marylebone) and for Reading, via Oxford.

Layout
The present Art Deco-style station, which dates from immediately prior to the Second World War (it was comprehensively rebuilt between 1937 and 1939), has four platforms which are numbered one to four from south to north.  Platforms one and four are west-facing bays, used only by local trains to and from Birmingham Snow Hill, Stratford-upon-Avon or  starting or terminating at Leamington. Platforms two and three are through platforms: platform two is used by services to Stratford-upon-Avon, Birmingham Snow Hill or Coventry, Birmingham New Street and beyond; platform three is for departures to Banbury and London Marylebone or Reading. Two central lines allow freight trains or other non-stop services to pass through the station when platforms two and three are occupied.

Services

Chiltern Railways

On Sundays, the frequency of trains is in most cases about half of that indicated above, though the service to and from Stratford remains two-hourly.

CrossCountry
One long-distance train per hour, operated by CrossCountry, stops in each direction.

West Midlands Railway

Motive power depots
The London and Birmingham Railway opened a motive power depot on the west side of the line at their Milverton station in 1844. It was replaced by a larger engine shed nearby in 1881, which was known as Warwick (Milverton). This depot closed 17 November 1958 and was demolished. Locomotives were then serviced at the former Great Western Railway depot at Leamington Spa.

The Great Western Railway opened a motive power depot on the east side of the line south of Leamington Spa General Station in 1906. This was closed by British Railways 14 June 1965 and demolished.

References

External links

Solihull and Leamington Rail Users Association – representing the interests and views of local rail users
Historical photographs of the GWR Leamington Spa station

Buildings and structures in Leamington Spa
Railway stations in Warwickshire
DfT Category C1 stations
Former Great Western Railway stations
Railway stations in Great Britain opened in 1852
Railway stations served by Chiltern Railways
Railway stations served by CrossCountry
Railway stations served by West Midlands Trains
Grade II listed railway stations
Grade II listed buildings in Warwickshire
Art Deco railway stations
Art Deco architecture in England
1852 establishments in England